Rosaryville (also Gessen) is an unincorporated community in Tangipahoa Parish, Louisiana, United States.

Notes

Unincorporated communities in Tangipahoa Parish, Louisiana
Unincorporated communities in Louisiana